Mycena vinacea is a species of mushroom in the family Mycenaceae. Found in Australia, it was first described scientifically by John Burton Cleland in 1931.

References

External links

vinacea
Fungi of Australia
Taxa named by John Burton Cleland